The Germany women's cricket team toured Austria in August 2020 to play a five-match bilateral Women's Twenty20 International (WT20I) series. The matches were played at the Seebarn Cricket Ground in the Seebarn subdivision of Harmannsdorf, Lower Austria.

The series was the first women's international cricket to be played since the 2020 ICC Women's T20 World Cup Final on 8 March 2020, following widespread disruption caused by the COVID-19 pandemic. Austria had last played a match in a quadrangular series in France in August 2019, and Germany had last played an international match during their visit to Oman in February 2020.

Germany won the series 5–0, breaking a number of records along the way.  In match two of the series, the unbeaten opening partnership of 191 between Christina Gough and Janet Ronalds meant that Germany set a WT20I record for the most runs scored in an innings without losing a wicket. The same pair broke this record again in match four, with Germany's innings finishing on 198/0, before German captain Anuradha Doddaballapur became the first player to take four wickets in consecutive deliveries in WT20I cricket.

Squads

WT20I series

1st WT20I

2nd WT20I

3rd WT20I

4th WT20I

5th WT20I

References

External links
 Series home at ESPN Cricinfo

Cricket in Austria
Cricket in Germany
Associate international cricket competitions in 2020